Synecdoche is a linguistic term.

Synecdoche may also refer to:
 Synecdoche (planthopper), a genus of planthoppers
 Synecdoche, New York, a 2008 American film